Edmund Horne of Canterbury, Kent, was an English politician.

Family
Horne married, before 1381, a woman named Christine.

Career
Horne was a Member of Parliament for Canterbury in 1371, October 1382, November 1384, 1391, September 1397 and 1406.

References

Year of birth missing
Year of death missing
People from Canterbury
English MPs 1371
English MPs October 1382
14th-century births
15th-century deaths
English MPs November 1384
English MPs 1391
English MPs September 1397
English MPs 1406